Grama Niladhari (village officers) is a Sri Lankan public official appointed by the central government to carry out administrative duties in a grama niladhari division, which is a sub-unit of a divisional secretariat. They come under the Grama Niladhari Division under the Home Affairs Division of the Ministry of Home Affairs. There are 14,022 grama niladhari divisions under 331 divisional secretary’s division in the island.

The duties of a grama niladhari include the reporting of issuing of permits, gathering statistics, maintaining the voter registry and keeping the peace by settlement of personal disputes. They are responsible for keeping track of criminal activity in their area and issuing a certificate of residence and character on behalf of residents when requested by them. They may arrest individuals if sworn in as a Peace Officer. Establish and co-ordinate administrative policies and procedures for required community members and officials of the divisional secretariats.

The post of Grama Sevaka (village servant) was created in May 1963 as part of the public administration reforms carried out by Minister Felix Dias Bandaranaike in the Sirimavo Bandaranaike government, which replaced the post of village headman (Vidane) which dated back to the British the colonial era. All serving village headman were re-designated as Grama Sevakas under the Village Headmen (Change of Designation) Act, No. 6 of 1964. The designation modeled on that of public servant was later changed to grama niladhari which translated to village leader.

Notable Grama Niladharis
Maithripala Sirisena

See also 
Native headmen of Ceylon
Vidane
Government of Sri Lanka

References 

Find a grama niladari details
Grama niladhari divisions
Grama niladhari software launching program
Grama Niladhari software system in Sinhala language

Sri Lankan government officials